Calcium pangamate is a mineral supplement. It is sometimes used as a synonym for pangamic acid.

References 

Calcium compounds